Crithagra is a genus of small passerine birds in the finch family (Fringillidae). They live in Africa and Arabia.

The species in this genus were formerly assigned to the genus Serinus, but phylogenetic analysis of mitochondrial and nuclear DNA sequences found that the genus was polyphyletic. It was therefore split into two monophyletic genera. Eight species, including the European serin (Serinus serinus), were retained in Serinus, while the other species were assigned to the resurrected genus Crithagra.

The genus was introduced in 1827 by the English ornithologist William John Swainson. The type species was subsequently designated as the brimstone canary. The name comes from the classical Greek krithē for "barley" and agra for "hunting".

The genus contains 37 species:
Príncipe seedeater, Crithagra rufobrunnea
São Tomé grosbeak, Crithagra concolor
African citril, Crithagra citrinelloides
Western citril, Crithagra frontalis
Southern citril, Crithagra hyposticta
Black-faced canary, Crithagra capistrata
Papyrus canary, Crithagra koliensis
Forest canary, Crithagra scotops
White-rumped seedeater, Crithagra leucopygia
Black-throated canary, Crithagra atrogularis
Yellow-rumped seedeater, Crithagra xanthopygia
Reichenow's seedeater, Crithagra reichenowi
Arabian serin, Crithagra rothschildi
Yellow-throated seedeater, Crithagra flavigula
Salvadori's seedeater, Crithagra xantholaema
Lemon-breasted canary, Crithagra citrinipectus
Yellow-fronted canary, Crithagra mozambica
White-bellied canary, Crithagra dorsostriata
Ankober serin, Crithagra ankoberensis
Yemen serin, Crithagra menachensis
Cape siskin, Crithagra totta
Drakensberg siskin, Crithagra symonsi
Northern grosbeak-canary, Crithagra donaldsoni
Southern grosbeak-canary, Crithagra buchanani
Yellow canary, Crithagra flaviventris
Brimstone canary, Crithagra sulphurata
Stripe-breasted seedeater, Crithagra striatipectus
Reichard's seedeater, Crithagra reichardi
Streaky-headed seedeater, Crithagra gularis
West African seedeater, Crithagra canicapilla
Black-eared seedeater, Crithagra mennelli
Brown-rumped seedeater, Crithagra tristriata
White-throated canary, Crithagra albogularis
Thick-billed seedeater, Crithagra burtoni
Streaky seedeater, Crithagra striolata
Yellow-browed seedeater, Crithagra whytii
Kipengere seedeater, Crithagra melanochroa
Protea canary, Crithagra leucoptera

References

 
Fringillidae
Bird genera